Tiarella  is a genus of sea snails, marine gastropod mollusks in the family Mitridae.

This genus has become a synonym of Mitra

Species
Species within the genus Tiarella  include:
 Tiarella deprofundis (Turner, 2001): synonym of Mitra deprofundis H. Turner, 2001
 Tiarella gorii (Turner, 2007) : synonym of Pterygia gorii (H. Turner, 2007)
 Tiarella papalis (Linnaeus, 1758): synonym of Mitra papalis (Linnaeus, 1758)
 Tiarella puncticulata (Lamarck, 1811): synonym of Quasimitra puncticulata (Lamarck, 1811)
 Tiarella scabricula (Linnaeus, 1767): synonym of Pterygia scabricula (Linnaeus, 1767) 
 Tiarella stictica (Link, 1807): synonym of Mitra stictica (Link, 1807)

References

External links
 Swainson W. (1840) A treatise on malacology or shells and shell-fish. London, Longman. viii + 419 pp.

Mitridae